Halls of Amenti is a one-song EP by Cephalic Carnage released by Willowtip Records. The song is 19 minutes in length. It is an experimental song done in a doom metal style, using some death metal vocals.

Halls of Amenti was intended to be the first in a series of three. The second release, titled Antarctica: Journey to Amenti, has not been released. The story revolves around a planet being turned into a block of ice, with its inhabitants eventually becoming allergic to the sun's rays, having to live underground to retain warmth. When the planet eventually begins thawing, the inhabitants are finally forced to face the deadly light.

It was played live for the first time at the 2008 Roadburn Festival.

Track listing

Personnel
 Lenzig Leal – vocals
 Zac Joe – guitar
 Steve Goldberg – guitar
 Jawsh Mullen – bass
 John Merryman – drums

Production
 Cephalic Carnage – production
 Dave Otero – production, recording, engineering, mixing

See also
 Amenti

References

External links
 Cephalic Carnage on Myspace

2002 EPs
Cephalic Carnage albums
Willowtip Records EPs